Contact is a 1992 short film directed by Jonathan Darby.

Summary
Two soldiers (one Arab, the other American) confront during wartime in the desert hoping to kill each other, but they must survive by cooperating while laying down their arms.

Cast
 Elias Koteas as Mohannan
 Brad Pitt as Cox
 J.T. Walsh as Radio Lieutenant

Crew
 Marcy Froehlich Costume Design
 Sabrina Italia Wardrobe Production Assistant

Accolades
It was nominated for an Academy Award for Best Live Action Short Film in 1993.

References

External links
 
AllMovie

1992 films
1992 short films
Gulf War films
American short films
1990s English-language films